Neculai Rățoi (March 15, 1939 – April 25, 2016) was a Romanian politician who served as the Mayor of Pașcani from 1981–2008, and as a member of the Chamber of Deputies of Romania from 2008 to 2012. He was member of the Social Democratic Party.

References

External links 
Neculai Rățoi on Chamber of Deputies official site

1939 births
2016 deaths
21st-century Romanian politicians
Social Democratic Party (Romania) politicians
Members of the Chamber of Deputies (Romania)
Mayors of places in Romania
Bucharest Academy of Economic Studies alumni
People from Pașcani